Chaubola (Hindustani: चौबोला or چوبولا) is a quatrain meter in the poetry of North India and Pakistan, often employed in folk songs.

Example
In one sequence in the Urdu opera Inder Sabha, Indra, the king of the gods, enters his court and announces in a chaubola -

References

Stanzaic form
Indian poetics
Poetic rhythm